Simon Leendert De Jong (April 29, 1942 – August 18, 2011) was an Indonesian-born Canadian parliamentarian. He was first elected to the House of Commons of Canada in the 1979 federal election as a New Democratic Party (NDP) Member of Parliament (MP) from Saskatchewan. He would spend five terms and 18 years in the House of Commons.

Early life
Simon De Jong was born in Sidoarjo, Indonesia, spending the first three years of his life, with his mother Dirkje and older brother Hielke in a concentration camp. Of 3,000 women and children who were incarcerated by the Japanese during the occupation of Java, only a third survived. Simon's father, a Dutch mariner, was also a prisoner-of-war. The family were reunited after the war and returned to the Netherlands. They came to Canada in 1951, and Simon spent his formative years in Regina. Despite being an immigrant and non-English speaker and having a stutter, De Jong trained himself in public speaking, at which he became a provincial champion. In 1964, he became head of the student union at the University of Regina, where he wrote a constitution that empowered students and sparked campus unrest.

Community activism
After graduating, De Jong turned to painting, receiving international notice as a visual artist. However, through a series of sessions with LSD researcher, Dr. Duncan Blewett, De Jong became fascinated with the possibilities for societal change represented by the burgeoning youth counter-culture of the late 1960s. In 1969 he left Regina for Vancouver, where he went to work for The Greater Vancouver Youth Communications Center Society,  better known as Cool Aid.  At Cool Aid, De Jong, Ray Chouinard and other street workers organized alternative health, work, housing and cultural programs that influenced the future of the city. One of De Jong's colleagues in those days was Mike Harcourt, who would later become the Premier of the Province of British Columbia.

Career in politics
De Jong returned to Regina in 1975. He ran as the NDP candidate for a Regina-area riding in 1979. His victory surprised everyone including De Jong himself. He would go on to serve five terms, retiring undefeated in 1997. As a parliamentarian, he exposed the spraying of the toxic defoliant Agent Orange by the U.S. military in the Canadian Province of New Brunswick. He was the first Member of Parliament to raise concerns about global warming. He spoke for disarmament at the United Nations; and he introduced a motion to send condolences to Yoko Ono when John Lennon was killed, which the artist gratefully acknowledged when De Jong died in 2011.

In 1989, De Jong was a dark-horse candidate to succeed Ed Broadbent as the leader of the NDP. He finished a respectable fourth in the leadership convention. However, a controversy overshadowed his candidacy. De Jong had agreed to be suited with a microphone in order to assist with a Canadian Broadcasting Corporation (CBC) documentary on the convention, but forgot he was wearing it and inadvertently allowed back-room negotiations with fellow candidate Dave Barrett to be recorded. The CBC documentary used the tape as the dramatic centre-point of its convention coverage, giving it a sinister spin, as a "secret deal" cut amid "shady" back-room politics. De Jong always denied the CBC's interpretation, insisting no deal was reached. Barrett remained silent about it. The documentarians re-enforced their characterization by mistranslating a second conversation thus gathered, a discussion in Dutch between De Jong and his mother, one of his advisors. The surrounding controversy hurt De Jong but was short-lived. However the scandal had lasting repercussions for De Jong within the party and contributed to his decision to retire some years later.

De Jong remained an MP until 1997 when he decided not to run for re-election in that year's federal election, stepping aside in favour of Lorne Nystrom, who had been unseated four years earlier. After retiring from parliament, De Jong spent time in the United States, Asia and Brazil, where he became involved with the Daime church and its powerful psychedelic sacrament, ayahuasca. De Jong became increasingly philosophical, joining the mystical insights of the Daime religion to concerns about climate change and the necessity for humankind to raise its consciousness. "The more aware we become, the better we become," he said.

De Jong once said of his colleague and friend Duncan Blewett, "He saw light and love and hope where others would see only darkness." This characterized De Jong himself. When he died of leukemia on August 18, 2011, he was mourned by people of all political stripes and beliefs, including former BC Premier Harcourt and Bob Rae, leader of the Liberal Party of Canada.

Electoral record

References

1942 births
2011 deaths
20th-century Canadian painters
Artists from Regina, Saskatchewan
Canadian male painters
Canadian people of Dutch descent
Deaths from leukemia
Indonesian emigrants to Canada
Members of the House of Commons of Canada from Saskatchewan
New Democratic Party MPs
Politicians from Regina, Saskatchewan
People from Surabaya
20th-century Canadian male artists